Matthew P. Roth (born September 15, 1964) is an American actor. He had a recurring role on Roseanne as Jackie's abusive boyfriend, Fisher, from 1992 to 1993.

He joined the cast of Desperate Housewives in fall 2006 as new neighbor Art Shephard.

Personal life
Roth began a relationship with his Roseanne co-star Laurie Metcalf. They have a son who was born in 1993 and a daughter who was born in 2005 via surrogate. They also adopted a son after fostering him at the age of six in 2006. They eventually married, and have also worked together on occasion, as in the 1994 feature film thriller Blink, the 1998 drama Chicago Cab, and Desperate Housewives. In September 2011, Roth filed for divorce citing irreconcilable differences. In May 2014, the divorce was finalized.
Roth married Stephanie Childers in 2015.

Filmography

References

External links
 

1964 births
Living people
Place of birth missing (living people)
American male television actors